The president of the Chamber of Deputies (Luxembourgish: Chamberpresident, French: Président de la Chambre des Députés, German: Präsident der Abgeordnetenkammer) is the presiding officer in Luxembourg's unicameral national legislature, the Chamber of Deputies.

Note that, during recess, the chamber does not have a president.  However, for continuity purposes, unless the president changes between one parliamentary session and another, the presidency is treated as though it is held continuously.

In addition, there were four extraordinary sessions, for which the Presidents were selected by virtue of being the oldest members.  In these cases, the Presidents were:
 11 January 1858: Mathias Ulrich
 24 June 1872 – 27 June 1872 Michel Witry
 6 July 1979: Jean-Pierre Urwald
 16 July 1984: Jean-Pierre Urwald

See also
 List of presidents of the Council of State of Luxembourg

Footnotes

 
Lists of political office-holders in Luxembourg
Luxembourg Chamber of Deputies